Konstantinos Christodoulou (born ) is a Greek male  track cyclist, riding for the national team. He competed in the sprint and team sprint event at the 2011 UCI Track Cycling World Championships.

References

External links
 Profile at cyclingarchives.com

1986 births
Living people
Greek track cyclists
Greek male cyclists
Place of birth missing (living people)
21st-century Greek people